The Plaza de la Encarnación is a new square in Seville, Spain which used to be a car park but has been transformed by a new piece of architecture the Metropol Parasol.

References 

Seville
Plazas in Seville